John Jukes may refer to:
 John Jukes (bishop)
 John Jukes (cartoonist)